Proto-Kam–Sui is the reconstructed ancestor of the Kam–Sui languages.

Reconstructions
A preliminary of reconstruction of Proto-Kam–Sui had been undertaken by Graham Thurgood (1988).

Another reconstruction of Proto-Kam–Sui, mostly based on Thurgood's reconstruction, was accomplished by Ilia Peiros as part of his reconstruction of Tai-Kadai, which was done without taking the Kra languages into account.

A new reconstruction of Proto-Kam–Sui is currently being undertaken by Peter K. Norquest.

History
Liang & Zhang (1996) consider western Guangdong to be the original homeland of Proto-Kam–Sui. According to Liang & Zhang (1996:25-29), based on evidence from Chinese written historical records, Kam-Sui languages were originally spoken in western Guangdong, but Kam-Sui peoples later started to migrate out of Guangdong during the Sui dynasty and Tang dynasty (from the years 600–800). Sui and Maonan migrations were completed by the Song dynasty, around the years 1000–1100, while the Lakkia migrated to their current location in Guangxi from Huaiji County and Fengkai County, Guangdong during the beginning of the Ming dynasty (years 1300–1400).

Lexicon
Thurgood's (1988: 209–218) reconstructed Proto-Kam–Sui forms are listed below.

 *hwaːt7 'angry'
 *hnaːn5 'angry'
 *taːp7 'to answer'
 *mwit8 'ant'
 *laːk8 'arm'
 *k-xiːn1 'arm'
 *khjaːk7 'armpit'
 *taŋ1 'arrive, reach'
 *cha5 'ascend'
 *phwuːk7 'ashes'
 *phlaːu5 'ashes'
 *pa3 'aunt'
 *hlaːi1 'back(bone)'
 *lun2 'back, behind'
 *hwaːi6 'bad, cruel'
 *thruk7 'bamboo strip'
 *xwan1 'bamboo'
 *pwaŋ5 'bank, shore'
 *khrau5 'to bark'
 *ɗuŋ3 'basket, winnowing'
 *ʔaːp7 'bathe'
 *ʔmuːi1 'bear'
 *m-luːt8 'beard'
 *hȵiŋ1 'bedbug'
 *mit8 'bee'
 *daːŋ2 'bee'
 *ʔdlu1 'bee, wasp'
 *te3 'below'
 *mluk8 'bird'
 *krip7 'bite; chew'
 *kam1 'bitter'
 *ʔnam1 'black'
 *ɓuːt7 'blind'
 *phlaːt7 'blood'
 *hwaːt7 'blow (wind)'
 *dzup8 'to blow'
 *thrun1 'body'
 *tlaːk7 'bone'
 *cam3 'bow, bend'
 *duːi4 'bowl, cup'
 *ʔŋa5 'branch'
 *ciŋ5 'branch'
 *praːk7 'break, tear'
 **kraːŋ1 'bright'
 *ɣwaːi4 'brother, older'
 *dzuːk8 'to bundle'
 *hmuk7 'bury'
 *trai3 'to buy'
 *kaːt7 'cabbage'
 *laːp8 'candle'
 *ʔma5 'carry on back'
 *kjap7 'catch, grasp'
 *kaːm1 'cave'
 *khryap7 'centipede'
 *tak7 'chest (body)'
 *hmaːk7 'to chew'
 *hnaːi5 'to chew'
 *kaːi5 'chicken'
 *hŋlaːŋ5 'young chicken'
 *hmaːk7 'to chop'
 *pram3 'to chop'
 *khlap7 'close (eyes)'
 *m-xwa3 'cloud'
 *hnu1 'cold'
 *paŋ1 'collapse'
 *hma1 'come; return'
 *kjaːp7' 'to connect'
 *duŋ2 'copper'
 *ȵai6' 'count'
 *hraːŋ5 'a cover'
 *khruːi1 'cowry (money), shell(fish)'
 *hlaːi5 'to crawl'
 *da6 'cross, pass'
 *ka1 'a crow'
 *kat7 'to cut'
 *kaːt7 'to cut'
 *hŋwan1 'day'
 *ɗak7 'deaf'
 *ʔyam1 'deep'
 *hluːi5 'descend'
 *laːi4 'devil, ghost'
 *pjai1 'to die'
 *di6 'dirt, earth'
 *ɓja5 'disgusted'
 *k-hma1 'dog'
 *tu1 'door'
 *gwau2 'dove'
 *tak7 'draw water'
 *te3 'draw water'
 *pwjan1 'dream'
 *trwap7 'to drink'
 *tuk7 'drop, fall'
 *tuk7 'drop, fall'
 *dip8 'dull'
 *mpraːŋ1 'ear of grain'
 *khra1 'ear'
 *khjam1 'early'
 *caːn1 'eat'
 *krai5 'egg'
 *pjaːt7 'eight'
 *phe1 'end, tip'
 *ʔȵam5 'evening'
 *hlik7 'exchange'
 *ke4 'excrement'
 *mpiŋ1 'expensive'
 *ɗap7 'extinguish'
 *thla1 'eye'
 *ʔna3 'face, in front'
 *lai4 'to fall'
 *klaːi1 'far'
 *tut7 'fart'
 *gjaːŋ4 'feed, raise'
 *traːi5 'dry field'
 *ʔra5 'paddy field'
 *ʔdlyap7? 'fingernail'
 *pwai1 'fire'
 *kuːn5 'first'
 *mlit8 'fish (loach)'
 *mprai3 'fish'
 *pa1 'fish'
 *mum6 'fish'
 *ŋu4 'five'
 *k-hmat7 'flea'
 *naːn4 'flesh, meat'
 *nuk7'' 'flower'
 *muk8 'fog'
 *praːk7 'forehead'
 *ɗuŋ1 'forest'
 *laːm2 'to forget'
 *kup7 'field frog'
 *k-wai3 'small frog'
 *tiːk7 'full'
 *ɗai3 'to get, gain'
 *ʔȵaːk7 'gills'
 *khjaːi1 'to give'
 *ʔuːk7 'to go out, out'
 *paːi1 'to go, walk'
 *mwaːŋ1 'god, ghost'
 *ɗaːi1 'good'
 *gju4 'granary'
 *khlaːn1 'grandchild'
 *thrak7 'grasshopper'
 *pram1 'hair, head'
 *k-mja1 'hand'
 **kra3 'hard'
 *pram1 'to hatch'
 *ʔnaŋ1 'to have'
 *me2 'to have'
 *kru3 'head'
 *dai2 'to hit'
 *ʔŋam1 'to hold in mouth'
 *ʔuːm3 'hold (child)'
 *ȵam1 'to hold'
 *hŋuːm3 'to hold'
 *m-kwaːu1 'horn'
 *ma4 'horse'
 *hraːn1 'house'
 *ɓjaːk7 'hungry'
 *ʔre1 'husband'
 *mpaːk7 'insane'
 *ȵak8 'to insert'
 *tshaːp7 'to insert'
 *khjaːi3 'intestine'
 *khlit7 'iron'
 *daːp8 'to kick'
 *gruk8 'to kneel'
 *miːt8 'knife'
 *mbra4 'knife, sword'
 *khwe1 'late'
 *kru1 'to laugh'
 *khlut7 'lazy'
 *laːn4 'lazy'
 *pwa5 'leaf'
 *ʔniŋ3 'to lean'
 *mpliŋ1 'leech'
 *kla1 'left over'
 *kwa1 'leg'
 *tiːn1 'leg, foot'
 *lja2? 'lick'
 *ljaːm5? 'lick'
 *ɓau1 'light, to float'
 *ʔdlaːp7 'lightning'
 *maŋ4 'to like'
 *tap7 'liver'
 *ʔraːi3 'long'
 *kraːk7 'loom'
 *tuk7 'to lose, misplace'
 *nan1'' 'louse'
 *mprai1 'louse, chicken'
 *mprum1 'to love (child)'
 *thram5 'low'
 **ʔnuːn1 'maggot'
 *mpaːn1 'male (person)'
 *ʔme1 'mark'
 *hle1 'mark'
 *mpraːŋ1 'mat (straw)'
 *ŋe2 'meal, early'
 *mbrau2 'meal, late'
 *gja2 'medicine, to cure'
 *ta5 'middle'
 *muːn6 'monkey'
 *nüaːn1'' 'moon, month'
 *hjit7 'morning'
 *paːk7 'mouth'
 *muːk8 'mucus'
 *khlum5 'mud, dirt'
 *naːm5 'mud, dirt'
 *hŋla1 'mushroom'
 *taːk7 'to nail'
 *ɓlwa1 'navel'
 *phlai5 'near'
 *ke1 'net (to cast)'
 *hmai5 'new'
 *ʔnaŋ1 'nose, face'
 *man2 'oil'
 *kaːu5 'old (things)'
 *ke5 'old (vegetables)'
 *ɓjaːn3 'otter, beaver'
 *chaːt7 'otter, beaver'
 *ʔŋluːk7 'outside'
 *phwa3 'palm (hand)'
 *lin6 'pangolin'
 *laːk8 'person, child'
 *kjaːk7 'pestle'
 *cup7 'to pick up'
 *ɓit7 'to pick (flowers)'
 *laːi6 'to pick, select'
 *k-hmu5 'pig'
 *ʔdlaːi5 'wild pig'
 *dap8 'to pile'
 *ʔlaːu1 'pillar'
 *liːn2 'pipe, water'
 *ljum2 'to plant'
 *mpra1 'to plant'
 *ʔdram1 'to transplant'
 *pwak7 'pod, sheath'
 *hŋlaːn1 'shoulder pole'
 *ʔmiːn3 'porcupine, wild pig'
 *ʔdlaːk7 'to pull'
 *zuk8 'pus'
 *kat7 'to put'
 *naːŋ1 'raft, bamboo'
 *xwin1 'to rain'
 *hnu3 'rat, mouse'
 *ɗip7 'raw, live'
 *duk8 'to read'
 *hwa1 'right side'
 *zuk8 'ripe, cooked'
 *hma3 'to rise (river)'
 *ʔnja1 'river'
 *pra1 'rock, cliff'
 *kjaːŋ1 'root'
 *ʔlaːk7 'rope'
 *laːn6 'to rot'
 *naːu6 'rotten'
 **krin5 'scales'
 *khjaːn5 'to scare'
 *tak7 'to scoop'
 *ʔlun1 'to see'
 *ɗai3 'to see'
 *pwan1 'seed'
 *kla3 'rice seedling'
 *kwe1 'to sell'
 *ʔŋra1 'sesame'
 *tau1 'shadow'
 *ŋaːu2 'to shake'
 *m-hliːn5? 'shallow'
 *hraːi5 'be sharp'
 *gwan2 'to sharpen'
 *khjam1 'sharpened, pointed'
 *ɗau5 'spiral shell'
 *thrin3 'short'
 *pjau5 'shuttle'
 *nu4 'younger sibling'
 *ʔram1 'to sink'
 *dzuːi6 'to sit'
 *ljuk8 'six'
 *hŋra1 'skin'
 *ʔrwum1? 'skinny, lean'
 *ɓun1 'sky'
 *nuːn2 'to sleep'
 *nun4 'to smell'
 *dzuːi2 'snake'
 *ʔnuːi1 'snow'
 *hma5 'soak, pickle'
 *maːt8 'socks'
 *ʔma3 'soft'
 *khjum3 'sour'
 *tljaːi3? 'sparrow'
 *m-hljaːn5 'spicy (hot)'
 *pha5 'to split'
 *hmaːk7 'to split'
 *ŋa2 'sprout, a'
 *khlak7 'stake, post'
 *ʔdraːu1 'star'
 *hmlut7 'star'
 *ŋjaːu6 'to stay, live'
 *hljak7 'to steal'
 *luŋ2 'stomach'
 *mpwaːŋ1 'straw'
 *kruːi3 'stream'
 *kjak7 'to stuff'
 *hwit7' 'to stuff'
 *ʔuːi3 'sugar cane'
 *ʔiːn5 'a swallow'
 *phjit7? 'to sweep'
 *khwaːn1 'sweet'
 *khjut7 'tail'
 *ʔaːu1 'to take'
 *ɓraːk7 'taro'
 *ʔna1 'thick'
 *ʔnak7 'thick, viscous'
 *ɓwaːŋ1 'thin'
 *naːi6 'this'
 *tiːn3 'thunder'
 *lai6 'thunder'
 *pra3 'thunder, lightning'
 *mum4 'tiger'
 *khwe3 'tired'
 *ʔni5 'tired'
 *ma2 'tongue'
 *pjwan1 'tooth'
 *hȵa5 'trace, dregs'
 *mai4 'tree, wood'
 *kjaːt7 'to twist'
 *hra1 'two'
 *ta1 'uncle'
 *kam3 'upside down'
 *juŋ6 'to use'
 *ʔma1 'vegetable'
 *hruːi1 'vestige'
 *ɓaːn3 'village'
 *trwak7 'to vomit'
 *kra3 'to wait'
 *chaːm3 'to walk, crawl'
 *aːu1 'to want'
 *ʔlak7 'to wash clothes'
 *zuːk 'to wash hands'
 *ȵam3 'water'
 *traːu1 'we (incl.)'
 *tan3 'to wear'
 *tam3 'to weave'
 *kjaːn1 'to weave, plait'
 *ne1'' 'to weed'
 *ʔȵe3 'to weep, cry'
 *ɓun5 'well, spring'
 *ɓu5 'well, spring'
 *thlam1 'well, pond, pool'
 *ʔrak7 'wet'
 *hlwum1 'wind'
 *khlaːu3 'rice wine'
 *pwa5 'wing'
 *ɓjaːk7 'woman, girl'
 *trit7 '(fire)wood'
 *dzan4 'worm'
 *tuːk7 'to wrap, bundle'
 *ɓjuːt7? 'to wring towel'
 *kjaːt7 'to write'
 *man2 'yam'
 *mpe1 'year'
 *ɓjaːk7 'woman, girl'
 *trit7 '(fire)wood'
 *dzan4 'worm'
 *tuːk7 'to wrap, bundle'
 *ɓjuːt7? 'to wring towel'
 *kjaːt7 'to write'
 *man2 'yam'
 *mpe1 'year'

Comparison with Proto-Tai
Some Proto-Kam-Sui lexical items are cognate with Proto-Tai but differ in proto-tone.

Reconstructions are those of Norquest (2021).

Footnotes

References
Ostapirat, Weera. (2006). Alternation of tonal series and the reconstruction of Proto-Kam-Sui. In D.-A. Ho et al. (Eds.), Linguistics Studies in Chinese and Neighboring Languages (pp. 1077-1121). Taipei: Academia Sinica.

External links
Reconstruction of Proto Kam-Sui by Peter K. Norquest, hosted at the SEAlang Library

Kam–Sui languages
Kam-Sui